Tyniec nad Ślęzą  is a village in the Administrative District of Gmina Kobierzyce, within Wrocław County, Lower Silesian Voivodeship, in south-western Poland. Prior to 1945 it was in Germany.

Monuments 
 Gothic wayside shrine 
 Baroque statue of St. John of Nepomuk

References

Villages in Wrocław County